Palmula is an extinct genus of foraminifera which is known from a number of species found in rocks dating from near the beginning of the Jurassic to the end of the Cretaceous, in Africa, Asia, Europe, and New Zealand.  A genus of polycotylid plesiosaur was named Palmula in 2007, but because the name was already in use, the plesiosaur was renamed, becoming Palmulasaurus.

References 

Foraminifera genera
Jurassic life
Cretaceous life
Prehistoric life of Africa
Prehistoric life of Asia
Jurassic genus first appearances
Cretaceous extinctions